This is a list of German television related events from 2008.

Events
8 March - No Angels are selected to represent Germany at the 2008 Eurovision Song Contest with their song "Disappear". They are selected to be the fifty-third German Eurovision entry during Wer singt für Deutschland? held at the Deutsches Schauspielhaus in Hamburg.
17 May - Thomas Godoj wins the fifth season of Deutschland sucht den Superstar.
7 July - Silke "Isi" Kaufmann wins the eighth season of Big Brother Germany.
22 November - 44-year-old harmonica player Michael Hirte wins the second season of Das Supertalent.

Debuts

Free for air

Domestic
23 June - Doctor's Diary (2008–2011) (RTL)
14 December -  (2008) (RTL)

International
28 April -  Roary the Racing Car (2007–2009) (KiKa)

Cable

International
28 February -  Dexter (2006–2013) (Sky)
16 June -  The Secret Show (2006–2007) (Disney Channel)

BFBS
 Frankenstein's Cat (2008)

Television shows

1950s
Tagesschau (1952–present)

1960s
 heute (1963-present)

1970s
 heute-journal (1978-present)
 Tagesthemen (1978-present)

1980s
Wetten, dass..? (1981-2014)
Lindenstraße (1985–present)

1990s
Gute Zeiten, schlechte Zeiten (1992–present)
Marienhof (1992-2011)
Unter uns (1994-present)
Verbotene Liebe (1995-2015)
Schloss Einstein (1998–present)
In aller Freundschaft (1998–present)
Wer wird Millionär? (1999-present)

2000s
Big Brother Germany (2000-2011, 2015–present)
Deutschland sucht den Superstar (2002–present)
Let's Dance (2006–present)
Das Supertalent (2007–present)

Ending this year

Births

Deaths

See also 
2008 in Germany